Gellu Srinivas Yadav is a Telangana Rashtra Samithi politician from Telangana state in India. He is currently the state president of the student wing of the Telangana Rashtra Samithi (TRS Vidyarthi). TRS Party has named Gellu Srinivas Yadav as the party candidate for the Huzurabad by-election. He was defeated by Eatala Rajender of the Bharatiya Janata Party (BJP), in the end losing by 23855 votes.

Birth, Education 
Gellu Srinivas Yadav was born to Gellu Mallaiah and Lakshmi in Himmatnagar village, Veenavanka mandal, Karimnagar district, Telangana. He completed his primary education in Veenavanka. He  completed his BA from A.V college in Domalguda staying at the Government BC Welfare Hostel in Amberpet. Hyderabad. Gellu Srinivas Yadav holds a master’s degree (MA - Folk Arts) from the Telugu University and another master’s degree (MA - Political Science) from Osmania University. He has completed LLB as well. He is currently pursuing PhD in Political Science from Osmania University, doing research on the topic ‘Telangana Movement - The Role of KCR’.

Political life 
While pursuing graduation, Gellu Srinivas Yadav actively participated in protests along with BC Welfare Association President R. Krishnaiah on issues related to Backward Class students. He was elected as President, Govt. B.C. Hostel, Amberpet (2003 to 2006).

Gellu Srinivas Yadav joined the TRS party during the formation of the party in 2001. He was one of the founding members of the Telangana Rashtra Samithi Vidyarthi (TRSV). He was the TRSV President of AV College in Domalguda (2003-2006), TRSV President of Telugu University (2006-2007), General Secretary of Telangana Student Joint Action Committee (JAC). He became Osmania University TRSV President in 2011 and TRSV State President in 2017.

As Election Coordinator 
In the 2006 Sircilla Assembly, Karimnagar Lok Sabha by-election, Gellu Srinivas Yadav acted as  the Student Wing Coordinator He was in charge of the student wing of the Jadcherla Assembly in 2008 and campaigned for the 2009 Huzurabad Assembly. Gellu Srinivas served as the student wing coordinator in the Kolhapur Assembly constituency by-election in 2012 under the leadership of Koppula Eshwar. He was in charge of the Old Malakpet Division in the Greater Hyderabad Municipal Corporation elections in 2020.

References 

1985 births
Living people
Telangana politicians
People from Karimnagar district
Telangana Rashtra Samithi politicians